Gravel River may refer to:

 Gravel River (Northwest Territories), also known as Keele River, a tributary of the Mackenzie River
 Gravel River Provincial Park,  a nature reserve in the Thunder Bay District of Ontario, Canada
 Gravel River (Quebec), a river in Quebec, Canada, to the north of the lower Saint Lawrence River
 Gravel River (Thunder Bay District), a river in Northern Ontario that empties into Lake Superior

See also
 River gravel